Martin S. Bergmann (February 15, 1913 – January 22, 2014) was a clinical professor of psychology of the New York University post-doctoral program where he taught the course on the history of psychoanalysis. He was a major voice in the post-Freudian analysis and authored books on human conditions like the Holocaust, the phenomenology of love and child sacrifice. 
He was a member of the International Psychoanalytical Association and an honorary member of the American Psychoanalytic Association.  In the wake of 9/11 he wrote an article concerning its implications on psychoanalysis called "Psychoanalytical Reflections on September 11, 2001".  He was the son of Hugo Bergmann, a Prague-born Israeli philosopher, and father of Michael Bergmann.

On film
Bergmann contributed to the documentaries "The Century of the Self" (2002) by Adam Curtis  and Young Dr. Freud by David Grubin. He appeared as Prof. Louis Levy in Woody Allen's 1989 feature Crimes and Misdemeanors, and played SS NCO Zablocie in Schindler's List.

Crimes and Misdemeanors (1989) - Professor Louis Levy
Schindler's List (1993) - SS NCO Zablocie

Death
Bergmann died on January 22, 2014, aged 100.

Partial bibliography
 The Anatomy of Loving: The Story of Man's Quest to Know What Love Is (1987), Ballantine Books 
 Generations of the Holocaust (1991), Columbia Univ. Press, 
 In the Shadow of Moloch (1992), Columbia University Press 
 What Silent Love Hath Writ: A Psychoanalytic Exploration of Shakespeare's Sonnets (with his son Michael Bergmann, 2008), Separate Star, 
 Understanding Dissidence and Controversy in the History of Psychoanalysis (2004), Other Press 
 "The Unconscious in Shakespeare's Plays" (2013), Karnac

References

External links
 Martin S. Bergmann talks about his life and turning 100

1913 births
2014 deaths
New York University faculty
American psychology writers
American male non-fiction writers
American centenarians
American people of Czech-Jewish descent
Jewish American writers
Men centenarians
21st-century American Jews
American psychologists